Jackie Roberts (1912 – 17 July 1991) was a Barbadian cricket umpire. He stood in two Test matches between 1960 and 1962.

See also
 List of Test cricket umpires

References

1912 births
1991 deaths
West Indian Test cricket umpires